Takehiro Donoue (堂上 剛裕, born May 27, 1985 in Kasugai, Aichi) is a Japanese former professional baseball outfielder for the Yomiuri Giants in Japan's Nippon Professional Baseball. He played with the Chunichi Dragons from 2004 to 2014 and with the Yomiuri Giants in 2015 and 2016.

His younger brother Naomichi is also a professional baseball player currently playing for Chunichi Dragons.

External links

NPB.com

1985 births
Living people
Chunichi Dragons players
Japanese baseball coaches
Japanese expatriate baseball players in the United States
Nippon Professional Baseball coaches
Nippon Professional Baseball left fielders
Nippon Professional Baseball right fielders
North Shore Honu players
People from Kasugai, Aichi
Baseball people from Aichi Prefecture
Yomiuri Giants players